The 2020 Soul Train Music Awards took place on November 29, 2020, to recognize the best in soul, R&B and Hip-Hop music. The ceremony aired on BET, BET Her, VH1 and MTV2, with actors Tisha Campbell & Tichina Arnold hosting the ceremony for the third time. The nominations were announced on November 11, 2020, with H.E.R. leading with eight nominations, followed by Chris Brown with seven. American singer and songwriter Monica was honored with the Lady of Soul Award for her contributions to the music industry.

Special Awards
Honorees are as listed below:

Lady Of Soul Award
Monica

Winners and Nominees
Nominees are as listed below. The winners by each categories are in bold characters.

Best New Artist
Snoh Aalegra
Giveon
Layton Greene
Lonr.
SAINt JHN
Victoria Monét

Soul Train Certified Award
Brandy
Fantasia
Kelly Rowland
Ledisi
Monica
PJ Morton

Best R&B/Soul Female Artist
H.E.R.
Beyoncé
Alicia Keys
Jhené Aiko
Brandy
Summer Walker

Best R&B/Soul Male Artist
Chris Brown
Anderson .Paak
Charlie Wilson
PJ Morton
The Weeknd
Usher

Best Gospel/Inspirational Award
Kirk Franklin
Bebe Winans
Koryn Hawthorne
Marvin Sapp
PJ Morton
The Clark Sisters

Rhythm & Bars Award (Best Hip-Hop Song Of The Year)
Megan Thee Stallion – "Savage"
Cardi B – "WAP" 
DaBaby – "Rockstar" 
DJ Khaled – "Popstar" 
Drake – "Laugh Now Cry Later" 
Roddy Ricch – "The Box"

Song Of The Year
Chris Brown and Young Thug – "Go Crazy"
Beyoncé – "BLACK PARADE"
Chloe x Halle – "Do It"
H.E.R.  – "Slide"
Summer Walker & Usher – "Come Thru"
Usher  – "Don't Waste My Time"

Album Of The Year
Summer Walker – Over It
Chloe x Halle – Ungodly Hour
Brandy – B7
Chris Brown & Young Thug – Slime & B
Jhené Aiko – Chilombo
The Weeknd – After Hours

The Ashford And Simpson Songwriter's Award
H.E.R – "I Can't Breathe"
Written by H.E.R.
Beyoncé – "BLACK PARADE"
Written by Akil King, Beyoncé Knowles Carter, Brittany Coney, Denisia Andrews, Derek James Dixie, Kim "Kaydence" Krysiuk, Rickie Caso Tice, Shawn Carter, Stephen Bray
Chloe x Halle – "Do It"
Written by Chloe Bailey, Halle Bailey, Scott Storch, Victoria Monét, Vincent van den Ende, Anton Kuhl
Chris Brown and Young Thug – "Go Crazy"
Written by Cameron Devaun Murphy, Christopher Brown, Dounia Aznou, Jeffrey Lamar Williams, Johnny Kelvin, Kaniel Castaneda, Omari Akinlolu, OrvilleHall, Patrizio Pigliapoco, Phillip Price, Said Aznou, Soraya Benjelloun, Tre Samuels, Turell Sims, Wayne Samuels, Zakaria Kharbouch
Summer Walker  – "Playing Games"
Written by Summer Walker, Bryson Tiller, London Holmes, Kendall  Roark Bailey, Cameron Griffin, Aubrey  Robinson, Beyoncé Knowles, Kelendria Rowland, LeToya Luckett, LaTavia Roberson, LaShawn Daniels, Fred Jerkins III, Rodney Jerkins
H.E.R.  – "Slide"
Written by Charles Carter, Elijah Dias, H.E.R., Jermaine Dupri, Keenon Daequan Ray Jackson, Roger Parker, Ron Latour, Shawn Carter, Steven Arrington, Tiara Thomas, Wuang

Best Dance Performance
Chris Brown – "Go Crazy" 
Beyoncé – "Already" 
Chloe x Halle – "Do It" 
DaniLeigh – "Levi High" 
Missy Elliott – "Why I Still Love You"
Teyana Taylor – "Bare wit Me"

Best Collaboration Performance 
Chris Brown – "Go Crazy" 
H.E.R. – "Slide" 
Ne-Yo – "U 2 Luv" 
Skip Marley – "Slow Down" 
Summer Walker & Usher – "Come Thru"
Usher  – "Don't Waste My Time"

Video Of The Year
Beyoncé – "Brown Skin Girl" 
Chris Brown – "Go Crazy" 
Chloe x Halle – "Do It" 
Skip Marley – "Slow Down" 
H.E.R. – "Slide" 
Lizzo – "Good as Hell"

References 

Soul
Soul Train Music Awards
Soul
Soul